is a Japanese footballer currently playing as a defender for Reilac Shiga.

Career statistics

Club
.

Notes

References

External links

2001 births
Living people
Japanese footballers
Japan youth international footballers
Association football defenders
J3 League players
Kashiwa Reysol players
Tochigi SC players
Sportspeople from Chiba Prefecture